Cerosterna fabricii is a species of beetle in the family Cerambycidae. It was described by James Thomson in 1865. It is known from India and Laos.

References

Lamiini
Beetles described in 1865